An unseen character in theatre, comics, film, or television, or silent character in radio or literature, is a character that is mentioned but not directly known to the audience, but who advances the action of the plot in a significant way, and whose absence enhances their effect on the plot.

History 
Unseen characters have been used since the beginning of theatre with the ancient Greek tragedians, such as Laius in Sophocles' Oedipus Rex and Jason's bride in Euripides' Medea, and continued into Elizabethan theatre with examples such as Rosaline in Shakespeare's Romeo and Juliet. However, it was the early twentieth-century European playwrights Strindberg, Ibsen, and Chekhov who fully developed the dramatic potential of the unseen character. Eugene O'Neill was influenced by his European contemporaries and established the absent character as an aspect of character, narrative, and stagecraft in American theatre.

Purpose and characteristics 
Unseen characters are causal figures included in dramatic works to motivate the onstage characters to a certain course of action and advance the plot, but their presence is unnecessary. Indeed, their absence makes them appear more powerful because they are only known by inference. The use of an unseen character "take[s] advantage of one of the simplest but most powerful theatrical devices: the manner in which verbal references can make an offstage character extraordinarily real [...] to an audience," exploiting the audience's tendency to create visual images of imaginary characters in their mind.

In a study of 18th-century French comedy, F. C. Green suggests that an "invisible character" can be defined as one who, though not seen, "influences the action of the play". This definition, according to Green, would rule out a character like Laurent (Lawrence), Tartuffe's unseen valet,  whose sole function is merely to give the playwright an opportunity to introduce Tartuffe.

Unseen characters can develop organically even when their creators initially did not expect to keep them as unseen, especially in episodic works like television series. For instance, the producers of Frasier initially did not want to make the character Niles Crane's wife Maris an unseen character because they did not want to draw parallels to Vera, Norm Peterson's wife on Cheers, of which Frasier was a spin off. They originally intended that Maris would appear after several episodes, but were enjoying writing excuses for her absence so eventually it was decided she would remain unseen, and after the increasingly eccentric characteristics ascribed to her, no real actress could realistically portray her.

Examples

Comics
 Al Capp introduced Lena the Hyena in June 1946 as an invisible character in the Li'l Abner newspaper strip. She was described as "the world's ugliest woman". Characters always reacted in fright when they saw her or an image of her but readers couldn't see her because she was hidden behind objects or out of frame. Eventually Capp organized a contest in which readers could send in their own graphic interpretations of what she might look like. The winner was cartoonist Basil Wolverton, whose design was first shown in the 21 October 1946 strip.
 In Merho's comics series De Kiekeboes Mevrouw Stokvis, a friend of Moemoe Kiekeboe, is always mentioned or referred to, but has never actually been seen in the series.

Theatre 
Unseen characters occur elsewhere in drama, including the plays of Eugene O'Neill, Tennessee Williams, and Edward Albee. Author Marie A. Wellington notes that in the 18th-century, Voltaire included unseen characters in a few of his plays, including Le Duc d’Alençon and L’Orphelin de la Chine.

 Rosaline in William Shakespeare's Romeo and Juliet is never seen, but is only described.
 In Alain-René Lesage's 1707 play Crispin an unseen character called Damis with his forced secret marriage is essential to the plot.
 In Clare Boothe Luce's play The Women (1936), and the 1939 film based on the play, male characters (husbands, lovers, etc.) are referred to but do not appear, even in photographs.
 Godot in Samuel Beckett's Waiting for Godot is never seen. The play's two main characters spend the entire play waiting for Godot to arrive.
 In Anton Chekhov's play Three Sisters, Protopopov, who is cuckolding his employee Andrei and having a torrid and far from secret affair with Natasha, is unseen but plays a central role. Some sources suggest Protopopov, not Andrei, is the real father of Sofia, Natasha's daughter.
 The titular character in Mike Leigh's play Abigail's Party, the 15-year-old daughter of Susan Lawson, is attending a party next door to the events portrayed in the play, and is never seen.

UK television and radio 
 Dad's Army: Mrs Elizabeth Mainwaring, the wife of Captain Mainwaring, is never seen with the exception of the episode "A Soldier's Farewell" when her great weight in the bunk above Captain Mainwaring's causes her mattress to sag into camera shot. She appears in the 2016 movie.
 Minder: Arthur Daley's wife, referred to only as "'Er Indoors", is never seen or heard, but often quoted.
 Hi-de-Hi: Joe Maplin. Tyrannical, greedy and philandering owner of the six Maplins holiday camps. It was intended that he would be played by Bob Monkhouse, but he was unavailable for filming. Joe Maplin communicated with the entertainments staff through sarcastic, hectoring, semi-literate letters which Jeffrey Fairbrother would have to read to the staff. It was implied that sections of these letters contained coarse and vulgar language by the fact that Jeffrey Fairbrother would often skip sections of them under the pretence he was attempting to come to the point more quickly stating something like "Mr Maplin doesn't mince his words" to explain the omissions. Although unseen, there is a statue of Maplin which can be seen adjacent to the holiday camp entrance.
 Keeping Up Appearances: Hyacinth Bucket has a phone conversation in each episode with her son Sheridan, who has moved out and is attending university. 
Only Fools and Horses: Monkey Harris, Ugandan Morris, Sunglasses Ron and Paddy the Greek, Del Boy’s business associates. Paddy the Greek and Monkey Harris are mentioned in many episodes, often sourcing Del’s shoddy merchandise, yet are never seen. They are often described in discussions about wild nights down The Nag's Head. On one occasion Del Boy is beaten up on Rodney’s behalf. Rather than admit the truth of his injuries he claims to have fallen down the stairs at Monkey Harris’ house. It transpires Harris lives in a bungalow. 
The Archers: In this long-running British radio soap opera, a number of permanent inhabitants of the village in which the story is set are frequently referred to but are never heard in their own voices. Fans of the programme often refer to these characters as "the silents".
 Heartbeat: Throughout its entire 18-year run, PC Alf Ventress refers to his wife Mrs. Ventress, but she is neither seen nor is her first name ever revealed.

US television 
 On the mystery drama Columbo, Lieutenant Columbo often describes his wife in detail but she is never seen, heard, or otherwise portrayed in the series. A short-lived, unsuccessful spin-off series Mrs. Columbo was created in 1979 after Columbo had ended its run, but Lieutenant Columbo never appeared. Mrs. Columbo, as played by Kate Mulgrew, was named Kate (although Lieutenant Columbo's wife in Columbo was never given a name). The series gradually severed all ties with the original detective series. Both the series and the character herself were renamed in an attempt to change direction, but this did not help the poor ratings and the series was ultimately canceled in March 1980 after only 13 episodes had aired.
 On The Mary Tyler Moore Show, Phyllis Lindstrom's husband, Dr. Lars Lindstrom, is often referenced but never seen.
 On Rhoda, Carlton, the doorman in Rhoda Morgenstern's apartment building, is often heard on the intercom (voiced by Lorenzo Music) but almost never seen – only his arm would occasionally appear from doors and he was once shown dancing and conversing while wearing a gorilla mask. After Rhoda ended its run, Carlton was featured as an animated character in the 1980 spin-off special Carlton Your Doorman. Once again voiced by Music, Carlton is shown as a young man with shoulder-length blond hair and mustache.
 On Seinfeld, Bob Sacamano, Lomez, and "Cousin Jeffrey" are often mentioned but never seen. The first two are friends of Cosmo Kramer, and the last is the cousin of Jerry Seinfeld. Jeffrey works for the New York City Parks Department, as Jerry is told ad nauseam by his Uncle Leo.
 On The Andy Griffith Show, Juanita Beasley, for whom Barney Fife occasionally expresses affection, is unseen but often referenced and telephoned by the love-struck Fife.
 In Charlie's Angels, the titular Charlie Townsend, the owner of the detective agency that employed the series leads, was never seen, and was portrayed solely as a voice (provided by actor John Forsythe) heard on a speakerphone.
Vera Peterson from Cheers and Maris Crane from its spin-off Frasier are two of the most widely recognized unseen characters of American television, though Vera's body (with her face obscured by a pie) is seen in one episode, and her voice is heard in other episodes. Her voice was provided by Bernadette Birkett, the real-life wife of George Wendt who portrayed Norm Peterson, leading Wendt to comment that he never personally wondered what Vera looked like. Maris is also seen as a silhouette.
Stan Walker, the wealthy husband of Karen Walker on Will & Grace, has been depicted on screen only as hands and feet. Karen and Stan have divorced twice over the show's run, once after Stan faked his own death, leading the website CollegeHumor to label him as the one unseen character who "arguably drives the plot more than any other unseen character on a TV show."
On The Big Bang Theory, Howard Wolowitz's mother, Debbie, was always heard but almost never seen in the entire first eight seasons in which she was on the show.  She was voiced by Carol Ann Susi until Susi's death in 2014, after which the character was killed off.
On the Netflix animated television series BoJack Horseman, Mr. Peanutbutter often shouts to an off-screen, implicitly outlandish, character known as "Erica".

References 

 
Fictional characters by role in the narrative structure